Zidurile may refer to several villages in Romania:

 Zidurile, a village in Mozăceni Commune, Argeș County
 Zidurile, a village in Odobești Commune, Dâmbovița County